José de Canterac (July 29, 1786, Casteljaloux, Lot-et-Garone, France – April 13, 1835, Madrid, Spain) was a Spanish general of French origin who fought in the Spanish American wars of independence. In 1816 he joined the army of Pablo Morillo, fighting in the expedition against Isla Margarita. As Field Marshal, he took command of the Spanish Army in South America in 1822 and gained victories at the battles of Ica (1822) and Moquegua (1823). His defeats in 1824 at the Battle of Junín and the Battle of Ayacucho led to his capitulation to the Patriot forces. Upon his return to Spain, Canterac was made Captain General of Madrid. He was killed in 1835 in an insurrection at the Puerta del Sol.

References
Memoirs of general Miller, in the service of the republic of Peru,1828. Volumen 2

1779 births
1835 deaths
Spanish generals
Royalists in the Hispanic American Revolution
People of the Peruvian War of Independence
People of the Latin American wars of independence
Spanish people of French descent
Spanish military personnel killed in action